The Uhrencup is a club football tournament, held annually in Grenchen and Biel in Switzerland. The Uhrencup is seen as a testament to the major influence that is exercised by the local industry on the cultural lives of the area's residents. The tournament usually features four teams (sometimes more), each playing two matches, and is held in July as a friendly tournament, the format of which tends to be fluid. For the teams taking part, the tournament is a welcome opportunity to prepare for the upcoming football season.

Origin
Founded in 1962 by representatives of Grenchen's watchmaking industry, the first Uhrencup was held to celebrate the inauguration of the new grandstand at the local Brühl stadium. Due to the tournament's reverberating success it was repeated the following year and, thanks to the sponsoring from the local watch industry, it continues to be held annually (with the exception of 1967, 1974 and 2012).

History

Established as an international tournament (1962–1968)
The first Uhrencup in 1962 already featured an international line-up. Together with the two local clubs FC Grenchen and FC Biel-Bienne, the Belgian team Cercle Brügge and Italian team AC Como also took part in the tournament. Due to its success and because it attracted about 20,000 spectators, it was repeated the following year.

The English side Ipswich Town won the tournament in 1963 and the Dutch team Sparta Rotterdam was the second international representative. A year later German club Karlsruher SC and the French team Nîmes Olympique competed in the Uhrencup. In 1965 Lanerossi Vicenza won the competition, Maccabi Tel Aviv also took part. In 1966 and again in 1968 FC Sochaux took part, winning the first of the two competitions, but not being at all successful two years later. In 1967 the competition was not held.

Uhrencup as regional event (1969–2002)
At the end of the 1967–68 Nationalliga A season Grenchen were relegated and therefore the tournament lost its international significance. From here on it was mainly Swiss sides that took part in the Uhrencup and it turned into a regional event. FC Basel took part for the first time in 1969 and won the cup 5–3 in the final against Biel-Bienne, Wenger, Hauser (twice), Balmer and Odermatt scoring the Basel goals. A year later Basel defended the title with an 8–7 win after penalties following a 5–5 at full-time.

The next year the home team Grenchen won the cup for the second time, winning 3–1 against reigning Swiss Champions Basel, local boy Serge Muhmenthaler scoring one of the Grenchen goals. Neuchâtel Xamax won the Uhrencup 1972. Young Boys won the title 1973, Serge Muhmenthaler scoring a goal and winning his second Uhrencup title this time with his new team. In 1974 the competition was not held. Young Boys (1975) and Zürich (1976) were the next two cup winners. Serge Muhmenthaler reached his third Uhrencup Final with his third club in 1977 but was unable to repeat the success, the final ended in a 6–1 defeat against Neuchâtel Xamax. However reaching the final again in the next year Muhmenthaler won the 1978 Uhrencup with FC Basel 2–1 against the same finalists.

Basel won the title six times (1978, 1979, 1980, 1983, 1986, 1988), Grenchen won it three times (1981, 1982, 1985), Servette (1984) and Young Boys (1987) during the following years. As international teams were again invited to participate Partizan Belgrade (1989), Górnik Zabrze (1990) and 1. FC Köln (1991) competed and won the tournament.

During the following years (1992 to 2002) the Uhrencup returned to being a Swiss-Internal tournament. The winners being FC Zürich (three times), Grenchen (twice) and FC Solothurn, Grasshoppers and Sevette each once. FC Subingen, a team from the 2. Liga (then fourth tier of the Swiss Football League) won Uhrencup in 1997.

New edition as an international tournament (2003–2011)
In 2003 a new organising committee took over the marketing of the Uhrencup and with added financial help it was again possible to invite international teams. Casino SW Bregenz, FC Schalke 04, 1. FC Kaiserslautern (twice), 1. FC Köln, Bayer Leverkusen, FC Red Bull Salzburg, Celtic Glasgow, Borussia Dortmund, Legia Warsaw and Panathinaikos Athens have participated during this period, but only Trabzonspor (2005) and Shakhtar Donetsk (2009) were able to win the title.

2010 was a truly international affair, with only one club (Young Boys) originating from Switzerland. The remaining competitors were Deportivo de La Coruña from Spain, the Dutch side Twente Enschede and the eventual winner VfB Stuttgart from Germany.

Basel won the competition for the twelfth time. In the 2011 event, they beat Hertha Berlin 3–0, and then went on to defeat West Ham 2–1 in their second game. The second Swiss team, Young Boys Bern, also won both matches against the international teams, but had a lower overall goal score with 6–3. To celebrate the 50th edition of the tournament, the current German champion Borussia Dortmund played a friendly game against the Swiss vice champion FC Zürich, which ended with a 1–1 tie.

Since 2013
In 2012 the tournament was not held, but was held in 2013 between 5 and 9 July with Basel and Grasshopper Club Zürich taking part. For Basel it was be the 29th time that they would take place; they have won the competition thirteen times. The tournament again took a hiatus, this time of two years before returning in 2015.

2011

Standings

Matches

2013

Standings

Matches

2015

Standings

Matches

2016

Standings

Matches

2017

Standings

Results

2018

Standings

Results

2019

Standings

Results

Uhrencup winners by year

Titles by team

Participation by club

See also 
Swiss Super League
List of football (soccer) competitions

References

External links
 Official site

Swiss football friendly trophies
Recurring sporting events established in 1962
1962 establishments in Switzerland